Shalom TV may refer to:
 Jewish Broadcasting Service, a non-profit national Jewish television network
 Shalom (TV channel), an Indian Malayalam Christian television channel